is a Japanese word which means "market". 
Ichiba may also refer to the following:
Ichiba Station (disambiguation), name of several train stations
Ichiba, Tokushima